The Men's 50 kilometres race walk event at the 2011 World Championships in Athletics was held on September 3 on a loop course starting and finishing at Gukchae – bosang Memorial Park in the center of Daegu.

Yohann Diniz took the early lead, challenged by Nathan Deakes until Diniz was disqualified.  Deakes continued to lead by as much as 30 seconds over Sergey Bakulin but began to falter with hamstring problems.  First he was passed by Bakulin before dropping out.  Bakulin stretched out to almost a 2-minute lead, between 40 and 45 km, only Jared Tallent looked like he had a chance, gaining several seconds per kilometer but not really enough to make a dent in the huge lead.  Tallent paid for the extra effort trying to chase the leader, slowing considerably on the final 2 km lap, being passed by world record holder Denis Nizhegorodov. Bakulin would later be found Guilty of Doping and have the Gold Stripped from him and handed to Nizhegorodov.  Nizhegorodov is also currently under suspicion of Doping, with his B Sample yet to be tested, after his A Sample Tested Positive. Nizhegorodov, still currently holds the Gold Medal as of May 2016.

Medalists

Records

Qualification standards

Schedule

Results

Final

References

External links
50 kilometres walk results at IAAF website
results at IAAF website

Walk 50
Racewalking at the World Athletics Championships